In graph theory, a branch of mathematics, a linear forest is a kind of forest formed from the disjoint union of path graphs. It is an undirected graph with no cycles in which every vertex has degree at most two. Linear forests are the same thing as claw-free forests. They are the graphs whose Colin de Verdière graph invariant is at most 1.

The linear arboricity of a graph is the minimum number of linear forests into which the graph can be partitioned. For a graph of maximum degree , the linear arboricity is always at least , and it is conjectured that it is always at most .

A linear coloring of a graph is a proper graph coloring in which the induced subgraph formed by each two colors is a linear forest. The linear chromatic number of a graph is the smallest number of colors used by any linear coloring.

References

Trees (graph theory)
Graph families